Uphall Primary School is a primary school in the London Borough of Redbridge whose former domestic science block is grade II listed by Historic England.

Organisation 
The school has five classes in each year group from Reception to Year 6. It also has two nursery classes. The school follows the National Curriculum for all year groups.

References

External links

Ilford
Primary schools in the London Borough of Redbridge
Grade II listed buildings in the London Borough of Redbridge
Grade II listed educational buildings
Community schools in the London Borough of Redbridge